Kabash is a mountain near Korisha in the Prizren Municipality of Kosovo. It is named after the Albanian Kabashi tribe, and is part of the wider Kabash Mountains chain (Bjeshkët e Kabashit) that belongs to the Sharr Mountains. It also holds the remains of the Saint Mark Koriški Monastery.

Conservation
Kabash Mountain is one of the protected areas of the Sharr Mountains designated as lands reserved for touristic development and sports/recreational activities, as well as grazing pastures and private properties for the local community that is located near the villages that border the National Park.

Fauna
Kabash Mountain is home to several different species of fauna, notably the European badger.

Notes

References

Mountains of Kosovo